John Kimball may refer to:
 John Kimball (politician, born 1796) (1796–1884), American attorney and politician in New Hampshire and Vermont 
 John Kimball (politician, born 1821) (1821–1912), American engineer and politician in New Hampshire
 John W. Kimball, American soldier and politician in Massachusetts

See also
 John Kimble, the lead character in the film Kindergarten Cop